May Beattie (born c. 1950) is a unionist politician in Northern Ireland.

Born in Carrickfergus, Beattie became involved in politics by assisting the Democratic Unionist Party (DUP) during elections.  She became a party member in the early 1990s, and first stood for election to Carrickfergus Borough Council at the 1993 Northern Ireland local elections.

Although unsuccessful, she was elected for the DUP in East Antrim at the Northern Ireland Forum election in 1996, and sat on the forum's health committee. She gained a seat on Carrickfergus council in 1997, and held this in 2001, 2005 and 2011. She was Mayor of Carrickfergus in 2003–4 and sits on a large number of committees. She is currently an alderman.

Beattie has also been s secretary for the DUP's East Antrim branch and for the East Antrim Imperial Association, and was previously a member of the Association of Loyal Orangewomen of Ireland.

In the 2019 Northern Ireland local elections, she unsuccessfully ran as a Traditional Unionist Voice candidate in the Knockagh ward for Mid and East Antrim Borough Council

References 

Year of birth missing (living people)
Living people
Democratic Unionist Party councillors
Members of Carrickfergus Borough Council
Mayors of places in Northern Ireland
Members of the Northern Ireland Forum
People from Carrickfergus
Women mayors of places in Northern Ireland
Women councillors in Northern Ireland